Diego Junqueira (born December 28, 1980) is a professional tennis player who plays left-handed (with a double-handed backhand) from Argentina. His highest rank was world no.68, achieved on March 9, 2009.

Junior career
Diego "Chuky" Junqueira did not appear to have much of a juniors career, according to available ITF results, which show only one top-level tournament for him, in which he qualified and lost first round in Argentina in 1998.

Professional career

2000 to 2007
Junqueira reached a career high of #146 in June 2006.

2008
During late February to early April, Junqueira had good success at the Challenger level,
reaching the semifinal in Chile (losing to No. 140 Eduardo Schwank), the final in Ecuador (beating No. 155 Fernando Vicente along the way), and the semifinal in France (beating No. 105 Boris Pašanski and No. 192 Marc López), to get himself back into the top-200 for the first time in almost 2 years.

In May, he won a Challenger in Italy, beating No. 206 Dick Norman, No. 162 Harel Levy, No. 97 Santiago Ventura, No. 153 Nicolas Devilder, and No. 149 Máximo González, those last four being the No. 6, No. 1, No. 5, and No. 4 seeds in the tournament. He then beat No. 102 Luis Horna in the qualifying round to make the main draw of the 2008 French Open.

2009

In the 2009 Australian Open, he lost to Richard Gasquet in a four set match in the first round.

References

External links
 
 
 Junqueira World Ranking History

1980 births
Living people
Argentine male tennis players
People from Tandil
Tennis players from Buenos Aires